Liselott Linsenhoff (27 August 1927 – 4 August 1999) was a German equestrian and Olympic champion. Competing in the mixed dressage on the famous Swedish stallion Piaff, she won a gold medal  at the 1968 Summer Olympics with the West German team, and an individual gold medal at the 1972 Summer Olympics, becoming the first woman gold medalist in this event.

At the world championships, Linsenhoff was a member of the winning dressage team in 1974 and finished second individually in 1970 and third individually in Copenhagen in 1974. In addition, she won two individual (1969 and 1971) and one team European title (1973). Her daughter, Ann-Kathrin, was also an Olympic champion in equestrian sport.

Liselott was the daughter of Albert Schindling, the owner of the racing stable Asta. She lived in Taunus and was one of the most prominent German dressage riders, along with Josef Neckermann. In 1975, her family moved to Switzerland, which resulted in a conflict with the German tax  authorities, and retirement of Linsenhoff from sport shortly before the 1976 Olympics.

References

External links
 

1927 births
1999 deaths
German dressage riders
Olympic equestrians of the United Team of Germany
Olympic equestrians of West Germany
German female equestrians
Equestrians at the 1956 Summer Olympics
Equestrians at the 1968 Summer Olympics
Equestrians at the 1972 Summer Olympics
Olympic gold medalists for West Germany
Olympic silver medalists for West Germany
Olympic silver medalists for the United Team of Germany
Olympic bronze medalists for the United Team of Germany
Olympic medalists in equestrian
Sportspeople from Frankfurt
Medalists at the 1972 Summer Olympics
Medalists at the 1968 Summer Olympics
Medalists at the 1956 Summer Olympics